Gerald F. "Gerry" O’Leary was an American politician from South Boston, Massachusetts.

O'Leary was born on August 7, 1932, in Boston. He attended English High School of Boston, College of the Holy Cross, and Portia Law School. A student athlete, O'Leary ran the 400 metres at English and played running back for the Holy Cross football team.

O'Leary represented the 5th Suffolk District in the Massachusetts House of Representatives from 1965 to 1969. He then went on to serve on the Boston City Council from 1968 to 1975. He was the Council's President in 1969 and from 1974 to 1975. He ran for the United States Senate in 1972, but lost to Middlesex County District Attorney John J. Droney in the Democratic primary. In 1979, he was elected to the Boston School Committee. He resigned on October 4, 1980, after being arrested and charged with attempting to extort a $650,000 kickback from a school bus company. He pleaded guilty to violating the Hobbs Act and was sentenced to eighteen months in prison.

O'Leary had a wife, who died of breast cancer, and 5 daughters who remain alive today. He has 3 grandchildren.

O'Leary died on May 23, 2014, at his home in Quincy, Massachusetts.

References

1932 births
2014 deaths
American politicians convicted of federal public corruption crimes
Boston City Council members
Boston School Committee members
College of the Holy Cross alumni
Holy Cross Crusaders football players
Democratic Party members of the Massachusetts House of Representatives
New England Law Boston alumni
Politicians from Quincy, Massachusetts
Massachusetts politicians convicted of crimes
People from South Boston